Arthur Sutton Valpy (28 March 1849 – 15 June 1909) was a canon of Winchester Cathedral.

Early life and education
Valpy was a descendant of Richard Valpy and his wife Emily Anne Sutton. He was educated at Eton College (which he left in 1864) and at Gonville and Caius College, Cambridge, where he was awarded a Master of Arts degree in 1876 and was made a Fellow of the Society of Antiquaries.

He was ordained deacon at York in 1873, and priest the following year, serving curacies at Middlesbrough, 1873 to 1875, and at Kensington, 1875 to 1878.

Appointments
Valpy was Rector of Farnborough from 1878 to 1882.

He served as warden to the Church of England Soldiers' Institute and acting chaplain to the forces as Aldershot and as Rector of Holy Trinity, Guildford.

He was appointed Canon Residentiary of Winchester in 1895.

In December 1901, Valpy and his wife left London for South Africa, where he acted as Archdeacon of Kimberley and Rector of St Cyprian's Church during 1902.

Valpy as artist and his influence on English style
Canon Valpy has been credited with having injected "new life and a lightness of touch" in English style, as documented in interiors he painted in water-colours now preserved in the Victoria and Albert Museum in London. "This inspired churchman", comments Carolyn McDowell, "put together a collection of 18c furniture, decorated his plain walls with clusters of low hung watercolors and prints, used a pretty chintz loose cover on the chairs, replaced indiscriminate clutter with a few well chosen ornaments and placed piles of books lying around for reading, rather than for show". Over the mantel in his Drawing Room is a pre-raphaelite portrait by Rossetti, revealing that he was "a very astute purchaser".

Valpy's name appears in an address book belonging to James McNeill Whistler in the 1870s.

Valpy inherited Champneys a country house estate at Wigginton. He rebuilt the house in 1874 later selling it to Lady Rothschild between 1900 and 1902.

In memoriam
The beautifully carved wooden altar from St Edward's Church, Kenilworth, in Kimberley, South Africa, now at St Cyprian's Cathedral, Kimberley, bears an inscription in memory of "Arthur Sutton Valpy, Canon of Winchester, England, who fell asleep 15 June 1909. While in charge of S. Cyprian’s Kimberley, he assisted S. Edward’s in every way. R.I.P".

References

1849 births
1909 deaths
19th-century English Anglican priests
Alumni of Gonville and Caius College, Cambridge
Archdeacons
People educated at Eton College
People from Dacorum (district)
Winchester Cathedral